Nikola Ćaćić and Yang Tsung-hua were the defending champions but chose not to defend their title.

Antoine Bellier and Gabriel Décamps won the title after defeating Sebastian Fanselow and Kaichi Uchida 7–6(7–3), 6–3 in the final.

Seeds

Draw

References

External links
 Main draw

Shymkent Challenger - Doubles
2022 Doubles